Dubovoye is a rural locality (a settlement) in Svetloyarsky District, Volgograd Oblast, Russia. The population was 16 as of 2010. There are 2 streets.

Geography 
Dubovoye is located 95 km southwest of Svetly Yar (the district's administrative centre) by road. Kapkinka is the nearest rural locality.

References 

Rural localities in Svetloyarsky District